Death Walks in Laredo (also known as Three Golden Boys and The Pistol, the Karate and the Eye), is a 1967 Italian Spaghetti Western film directed by Enzo Peri and shot in Algeria. It is also influenced by the Sword-and-sandal film genre.

Plot
Three men are each provided with a part of a map and a photograph from the time when they were children: the American Whitey, the Frenchman Étienne and the Japanese Lester. Their maps lead all of them to the same gold mine. When they meet they figure out they are all sons of the late mine owner Langdon. The land around the mine has been bequeathed to them and the saloon girl Mady whom they recognise as their sister. Nonetheless, their heritage is under the sway of megalomaniac gangster boss Fuller, who dresses in toga and lives in a Roman-style palace with local women performing erotic dances. As a team they must fight him and his gang of thugs (who do wear Western outfit).

Cast 
 Thomas Hunter: Whitey Selby
 James Shigeta: Lester Koto
 Nadir Moretti: Étienne Devereaux
 Enrico Maria Salerno: Giulio Cesare Fuller
 Delia Boccardo: Mady
 Gianna Serra: Debbie
 Femi Benussi: Tula
 Umberto D'Orsi: Bronson 
 Ferruccio De Ceresa: Professor

References

External links

1967 films
1967 Western (genre) films
Spaghetti Western films
Films shot in Algeria
Films scored by Marcello Giombini
1960s Italian films